Calaca, officially the City of Calaca, is a component city in the province of Batangas, Philippines. According to the 2020 census, it has a population of 87,361 people.

Calaca is home to the lively Calacatchara festival (a portmanteau of Calaca and atchara (chutney).

Etymology
The name was taken from the roofs of the houses made of bamboos halves arranged over top of one another. One anecdote believes that: When it was still a sitio and long been called Calaca, three Spanish officials happened to pass by. They saw some carpenters making the roof of a house. They asked one of the carpenters about the name of the place. The carpenter, who did not know Spanish, believed that the Spaniards were asking what they were making and they answered, “calaca.” The Spaniards noted the name and since then, Calaca became the official name.

History
Calaca was part of Balayan when it was used to be a barrio. On May 10, 1835, it was officially converted into a town. Don Rufino Punungbayan was the first Gobernadorcillo of the municipality during the year 1835–1836.

Cityhood

On March 11, 2020, House Bill No. 6598 was filed for the conversion of the municipality of Calaca into a component city in the province of Batangas. Both the House of Representatives and the Senate passed the bill. On May 26, 2021, President Rodrigo Roa Duterte approved the bill through Republic Act No. 11544. On August 19, 2021, COMELEC postponed the plebiscite which seeks to ratify the conversion of the municipality of Calaca into a city for the preparation of the 2022 elections. On July 13, 2022, the election body sets the date of plebiscite on September 3, 2022. By virtue of Republic Act No. 11544 after ratification of the law, Calaca becomes the fifth city in Batangas and the first in the province's 1st legislative district.

Geography
According to the Philippine Statistics Authority, the city has a land area of  constituting  of the  total area of Batangas.

Barangays
Calaca is politically subdivided into 40 barangays.. As of June 30, 2021, there are five barangays that are considered urban (highlighted in bold).

Climate

Demographics

In the 2020 census, Calaca had a population of 87,361.

Economy 
Calaca is currently identified by the Philippine Statistics Agency as a 1st class municipal economic zone. The Philippine Statistics Agency as of September 2022 had not made a determination of the income classification on the city scale for Calaca based on the previous four years of revenue.

Gallery

References

External links

[ Philippine Standard Geographic Code]

Cities in Batangas
Component cities in the Philippines
Populated places established in 1835